Vinje may refer to:

Places

Antarctica
Vinje Glacier, a glacier in Queen Maud Land

Norway
Vinje, a municipality in Vestfold og Telemark county
Vinje (village), a village in Vinje municipality in Vestfold og Telemark county
Vinje, Vestland, a village in Voss municipality in Vestland county
Vinje, Sør-Trøndelag, a former municipality in the old Sør-Trøndelag county
Vinje, Troms, a village in Dyrøy municipality in Troms og Finnmark county
Vinje Hydroelectric Power Station, a power station in Vinje municipality, Vestfold og Telemark county

Churches
Vinje Church (Trøndelag), a church in Heim municipality, Trøndelag county
Vinje Church (Telemark), a church in Vinje municipality, Vestfold og Telemark county
Vinje Church (Vestland), a church in Voss municipality, Vestland county

Slovenia
Vinje, Dol pri Ljubljani, a dispersed settlement in Dol pri Ljubljani in the Upper Carniola region 
Vinje pri Moravčah, a small settlement in the municipality of Moravče in central Slovenia

United States
Vinje, Iowa, an unincorporated community in Winnebago County

People
Aad J. Vinje, a justice of the Wisconsin Supreme Court (United States)
Arne Vinje Gunnerud, Norwegian sculptor
Aasmund Halvorsen Vinje, Norwegian farmer, teacher, leader of a police district, civil servant, and politician
Aasmund Olavsson Vinje, famous Norwegian poet and journalist
Eva Vinje Aurdal, Norwegian politician for the Labour Party
Finn-Erik Vinje, Norwegian philologist and a professor at the University of Trondheim
Kristin Vinje, Norwegian chemist and politician for the Conservative Party
Torkell Vinje, Norwegian politician for the Conservative Party
Vebjørn Vinje, Norwegian footballer
Vetle Vinje, Norwegian competition rower and Olympic medalist